Kariya 2 is an Indian Kannada action gangster film directed by Prabhu Srinivas starring Santhosh Balaraj in the titular role and Mayuri Kyatari in the opposite lead role. The film is produced by Anekal Balaraj through his production company Santosh Enterprises. The score and soundtrack are composed by Karan B. Krupa while cinematography is handled by Srinivas Dewamsam. Different Danny, Ravi Varma, Mass Madha and Vikram Mor were hired as stunt directors. The movie was dubbed in Hindi as Ghajinikanth. It was reported that the makers had sold the copyrights for the South Korean remake version. This movie is an unrelated sequel to 2003 blockbuster Kariya.

Plot
The movie revolves around Kariya, a local goon who is hired by an underworld Don. Everything was fine until he falls in love with Janu aka Janaki. Janu was affectionate towards her father, but he was killed by the thugs. She misunderstood that Kariya killed her father. As a result, she intelligently kills him through her love drama. Later it is revealed that Kariya is alive and he is unable to recognise others. He can identify Janu.  Now, Janu lands in trouble when he sees her and follows her. What happens to them forms the rest of the plot.

Cast 

 Santhosh Balaraj as Kariya 
 Mayuri Kyatari as Janu aka Janaki
 Ajay Ghosh
 Sadhu Kokila
 Prabhakar
 Ashok
 Vardhan Theerthahalli 
 Nagesh Karthik
 Usha 
Raaj Balavaadi 
Ramaswamy 
Suresh Heblikar 
Shivaji Rao Jadhav

Production

Development 

In May 2016, P2 Productions announced their new venture Kariya 2 and shooting started in July 2016. Different Dany, who is known for many popular Kannada films as an action choreographer, was hired.

Themes 
The film is set to be an action gangster film which also focuses on the love story of the lead. The film's tagline is "Ivnu Bere Thara", which was revealed by the release of its first-look poster. The poster featuring Santhosh Balaraj illustrated his character as a don.

Music
The film's music is composed by Karan B. Krupa with lyrics penned by Jayanth Kaikini, Manju Mandavya and Chinmay.

References

External links 
 
 

2010s Kannada-language films
Indian action adventure films
Indian gangster films
2010s action adventure films
Films directed by Prabhu Srinivas